Chiayi Cheng Huang Temple is a Chinese temple dedicated to the City God or Cheng Huang Ye which is located in East District, Chiayi City, Taiwan. The temple was founded in 1715, it is one of the oldest and prominent temples in the region.

The temple applied for national monument status in 2011, but was not listed at the time. Another application was submitted to the Bureau of Cultural Heritage and approved in April 2015.

The temple offers an educational fund and charity programs. The first cangue processions held at the temple in six decades started in 2014.

References

1715 establishments in Taiwan
Religious buildings and structures completed in 1715
Religious buildings and structures in Chiayi City
Taoist temples in Taiwan
National monuments of Taiwan